Total cost of ownership (TCO) is a financial estimate intended to help buyers and owners determine the direct and indirect costs of a product or service. It is a management accounting concept that can be used in full cost accounting or even ecological economics where it includes social costs.

For manufacturing, as TCO is typically compared with doing business overseas, it goes beyond the initial manufacturing cycle time and cost to make parts. TCO includes a variety of cost of doing business items, for example, ship and re-ship, and opportunity costs, while it also considers incentives developed for an alternative approach. Incentives and other variables include tax credits, common language, expedited delivery, and customer-oriented supplier visits.

Use of concept
TCO, when incorporated in any financial benefit analysis, provides a cost basis for determining the total economic value of an investment. Examples include: return on investment, internal rate of return, economic value added, return on information technology, and rapid economic justification.

A TCO analysis includes total cost of acquisition and operating costs, as well as costs related to replacement or upgrades at the end of the life cycle. A TCO analysis is used to gauge the viability of any capital investment. An enterprise may use it as a product/process comparison tool.  It is also used by credit markets and financing agencies. TCO directly relates to an enterprise's asset and/or related systems total costs across all projects and processes, thus giving a picture of the profitability over time.

Computer and software industries
TCO analysis was popularized by the Gartner Group in 1987.  The roots of this concept date at least back to the first quarter of the twentieth century. Many different methodologies and software tools have been developed to analyze TCO in various operational contexts.

TCO is applied to the analysis of information technology products, seeking to quantify the financial impact of deploying a product over its life cycle. These technologies include software and hardware, and training.

Technology deployment can include the following as part of TCO:

 Computer hardware and programs
 Network hardware and software
 Server hardware and software
 Workstation hardware and software
 Installation and integration of hardware and software
 Purchasing research
 Warranties and licenses
 License tracking/compliance
 Migration expenses
 Risks: susceptibility to vulnerabilities, availability of upgrades, patches and future licensing policies, etc.
 Operation expenses
 Infrastructure (floor space)
 Electricity (for related equipment, cooling, backup power)
 Testing costs
 Downtime, outage and failure expenses
 Diminished performance (i.e. users having to wait, diminished money-making ability)
 Security (including breaches, loss of reputation, recovery and prevention)
 Backup and recovery process
 Technology/user training
 Audit (internal and external)
 Insurance
 Information technology personnel
 Corporate management time
Long term expenses
 Replacement
 Future upgrade or scalability expenses
 Decommissioning

In the case of comparing TCO of existing versus proposed solutions, consideration should be put toward costs required to maintain the existing solution that may not necessarily be required for a proposed solution. Examples include cost of manual processing that are only required to support lack of existing automation, and extended support personnel.

Facilities and built environment 
Total cost of ownership can be applied to the structure and systems of a single building or a campus of buildings. Pioneered by Doug Christensen and the facilities department at Brigham Young University starting in the 1980s, the concept gained more traction in educational facilities in the early 21st century.

The application of TCO in facilities goes beyond the predictive cost analysis for a new building’s “first cost” (planning, construction and commissioning), to factor in a variety of critical requirements and costs over the life of the building:

 replacement of energy, utility, and safety systems;
 continual maintenance of the building exterior and interior and replacement of materials;
 updates to design and functionality;
 and recapitalization costs.

A key objective of planning, constructing, operating, and managing buildings via TCO principals is for building owners and facility professionals to predict needs and deliver data-driven results.  TCO can be applied any time during the life of a facility asset to manage cost inputs for the life of the structure or system into the future.

Developing standards for TCO in facilities 
APPA, an ANSI Accredited Standards Developer, published APPA 1000-1 – Total Cost of Ownership for Facilities Asset Management (TCO) – Part 1: Key Principles as an American National Standard in December 2017. 

APPA 1000-1 provides financial officers, facility professionals, architects, planners, construction workforce, and operations and maintenance (O&M) personnel the foundation of a standardized and holistic approach to implementing TCO key principles. Implementation of TCO key principles can improve decision making, maximizing financial strategies over the life of an asset, starting at the planning and design stage and extends to the end of the asset's life.

APPA 1000-2, slated for publication in 2019, will focus on implementation and application of key TCO principals in facility management.

Transportation
The TCO concept is easily applicable to the transportation industry and to motor vehicle ownership, for example, the TCO defines the cost of owning an automobile from the time of purchase by the owner, through its operation and maintenance to the time it leaves the possession of the owner. Comparative TCO studies between various models help consumers choose a car to fit their needs and budget.

Some of the key elements incorporated in the cost of ownership for a vehicle include:
 Depreciation costs
 Fuel costs
 Insurance
 Financing
 Repairs
 Fees and taxes
 Maintenance costs
 Opportunity costs
 Downtime costs.

See also
Cost to company (CTC)
Capital expenditure (CAPEX)
Operating expense (OPEX)
Activity-based costing
Life cycle cost analysis
Total benefits of ownership
Total cost
Total cost of acquisition
 Vendor lock-in

References

Costs
Enterprise application integration
Information technology governance

fr:Coût total de possession